Israel Elimelech (ישראל אלימלך; born June 22, 1960) is an Israeli former basketball player. He played the point guard position. He was named to the 1992 Israeli Basketball Premier League Quintet.

Biography
Elimelech was born in Holon, Israel. He is 1.88 meters tall.

He played for Hapoel Holon, Hapoel Givatayim, Maccabi Tel Aviv, and Hapoel Eilat. He was named to the 1992 Israeli Basketball Premier League Quintet. Elimelech also played for the Israel national basketball team in the 1977 FIBA Europe Under-16 Championship, 1983 European Championship for Men, 1993 European Championship for Men, and 1995 European Championship for Men.

References 

Living people

Hapoel Ramat Gan Givatayim B.C. players

Hapoel Eilat basketball players
Israeli men's basketball players

1960 births
Hapoel Holon players
Maccabi Tel Aviv B.C. players
Sportspeople from Holon